Bradley Russell DeFauw (born November 10, 1977) is an American former professional ice hockey winger who played in the National Hockey League (NHL) with the Carolina Hurricanes.

Playing career 
DeFauw was drafted in the second round, 28th overall, by the Carolina Hurricanes in the 1997 NHL Entry Draft. He played for EV Zug of Switzerland's Nationalliga A in the 2005–06 season.

After playing four seasons for the University of North Dakota, DeFauw made his professional debut with the Cincinnati Cyclones of the International Hockey League in the 2000–01 season. During the 2002–03 season, on March 9, 2003, DeFauw was recalled from the Lowell Lock Monsters of the AHL to the Hurricanes.  The following night DeFauw made his NHL debut, making an immediate impression with scoring 2 goals and earning the first star award in a victory over the Columbus Blue Jackets. He finished the season with 3 goals in 9 games in what would be his only season in the NHL.

DeFauw pursued a European career for the past two seasons, spending the 2004–05 season with Växjö Lakers HC of Sweden's Allsvenskan league before joining EV Zug for the 2005–06 season. He only played two games for Zug, before joining Nationalliga B's EHC Visp, where he played 18 games. Then he went to the Norwegian team Vålerenga Ishockey where he played 13 regular season game and 15 playoff games, helping them to win the Norwegian championship.

DeFauw joined Colorado College's coaching staff as a volunteer assistant until October 18, 2006, when he signed with IF Björklöven of Sweden's Allsvenskan. The signing was put into motion by DeFauw's former coach Joakim Fagervall, who is now the coach at IF Björklöven. He played the remainder of the 2006–07 season with IF Björklöven. In the 2007–08 season, he joined Nordsjælland Cobras of Denmark's Oddset Ligaen, but after one year DeFauw left the team in May 2008 to complete the end of his professional career.

Career statistics

Regular season and playoffs

International

References

External links

1977 births
American men's ice hockey left wingers
Carolina Hurricanes draft picks
Carolina Hurricanes players
Cincinnati Cyclones (IHL) players
Ice hockey players from Minnesota
IF Björklöven players
Living people
Lowell Lock Monsters players
Nordsjælland Cobras players
People from Edina, Minnesota
North Dakota Fighting Hawks men's ice hockey players
Vålerenga Ishockey players
Växjö Lakers players
EHC Visp players
EV Zug players
NCAA men's ice hockey national champions
Apple Valley High School (Minnesota) alumni